This page lists the armoury (emblazons=graphics and blazons=heraldic descriptions; or coats of arms) of the communes in la Vendée. (Department 85)

Communes without arms 
The following communes don't have official arms, according to the information received from the city halls by La Banque du Blason, who were kind enough to provide the list:

L'Aiguillon-sur-Vie, Antigny, Auzay, Avrillé, Bazoges-en-Paillers, Benet, Boufféré, Bouillé-Courdault, Boulogne, Bourneau, La Bretonnière-la-Claye, Breuil-Barret, Cezais, Chaillé-sous-les-Ormeaux, La Chaize-Giraud, Chambretaud, Champagné-les-Marais, La Chapelle-Achard, La Chapelle-aux-Lys, La Chapelle-Hermier, La Chapelle-Palluau, La Chapelle-Thémer, Chasnais, Château-d'Olonne, Châteauneuf, Chavagnes-les-Redoux, Cheffois, Corpe, La Couture, Damvix, Doix, Dompierre-sur-Yon, Faymoreau, Le Fenouiller, La Ferrière, Fontaines, Fougeré, Froidfond, Le Girouard, Givrand, Grosbreuil, Grues, La Guérinière, L'Île-d'Elle, La Jaudonnière, Lairoux, Landevieille, Le Langon, Liez, Loge-Fougereuse, Les Magnils-Reigniers, Maillé, Marillet, Marsais-Sainte-Radégonde, Martinet, Le Mazeau, La Meilleraie-Tillay, Menomblet, La Merlatière, Mervent, Montreuil, Moreilles, Mormaison, Mouchamps, Moutiers-sur-le-Lay, Mouzeuil-Saint-Martin, Nalliers, Nieul-sur-l'Autise, Notre-Dame-de-Riez, Olonne-sur-Mer, Oulmes, Péault, Petosse, Les Pineaux, Pissotte, Poiroux, Pouillé, Puy-de-Serre, Puyravault, Rosnay, Saint-André-Goule-d'Oie, Saint-André-Treize-Voies, Saint-Aubin-la-Plaine, Saint-Cyr-des-Gâts, Saint-Denis-du-Payré, Sainte-Florence, Sainte-Foy, Sainte-Pexine, Saint-Étienne-de-Brillouet, Saint-Georges-de-Pointindoux, Saint-Germain-l'Aiguiller, Saint-Gervais, Saint-Hilaire-de-Voust, Saint-Hilaire-la-Forêt, Saint-Jean-de-Beugné, Saint-Juire-Champgillon, Saint-Julien-des-Landes, Saint-Laurent-de-la-Salle, Saint-Maixent-sur-Vie, Saint-Malô-du-Bois, Saint-Mars-la-Réorthe, Saint-Martin-de-Fraigneau, Saint-Martin-des-Fontaines, Saint-Martin-Lars-en-Sainte-Hermine, Saint-Michel-en-l'Herm, Saint-Michel-Mont-Mercure, Saint-Paul-Mont-Penit, Saint-Pierre-du-Chemin, Saint-Révérend, Saint-Sigismond, Saint-Urbain, Saint-Valérien, Saint-Vincent-sur-Jard, Saligny, Sallertaine, Sérigné, Le Tablier, La Taillée, Tallud-Sainte-Gemme, Thiré, Thouarsais-Bouildroux, Triaize, Venansault, Vendrennes, Vix, Vouillé-les-Marais, Vouvant, Xanton-Chassenon. (non exhaustive list)

A

B

C

E

F

G

H

I

J

L

M

N

O

P

R

S

T

V

References 

Vendée
Vendee